Kamsack, Saskatchewan, Canada is a town in the Assiniboine River Valley, where the Whitesand River joins the Assiniboine River. Highway 8 and Highway 5 intersect in the town.

History

In 1904, land was surrendered from the Coté First Nation for the Canadian Northern Railway station and the town site of Kamsack. Between 1905 and 1907 additional land was allocated, the northern sections of which were returned to Indian reserve status. In 1913 a further two-mile strip of land on the southern boundary was given, but returned in 1915 when it was identified the Coté people had lost too much of their best agricultural land. In 1963, further acres surrendered in 1905 were also reconstituted as reserve land. The interest in and surrender of land from the reserve’s southern boundary—nearest the Kamsack town site—resulted in part from speculation of its value for settlement.

The lands around what is now Kamsack were settled in the 1880s by a handful of agricultural settlers. The farming area around Kamsack was well settled by 1905. These farms consisted of a variety of ethnic groups which are still present to this day: Doukhobors, Ukrainians, Europeans, Americans and Eastern Canadians were all among the early settlers to the area.

In 1903 the Canadian National Railway and Kamsack railway station were built which literally forced the birth of Kamsack. The town is still today served by Via Rail passenger service.

The name Kamsack came from an early post office of the same name, which was located in one of the early settlers' homes. 
The name "Kamsack" came from a native word meaning "something vast and large". In the 1900s, the Doukhobor village called Nadezhda ('Hope'), some 15 km to the northwest of Kamsack, was the site of the annual general meetings of the Doukhobor community of Saskatchewan. By around 1910, the meeting site has shifted to the village of Veregin, some 10 km west of Kamsack, where a permanent Doukhobor central office was established.

The first buildings were constructed in 1904 along the north side of the Canadian National Railway Right-of-way.  These included a general store, drug store, pool room, hotel and post office. In the spring of 1905 the first school was opened in the Hallson building (named after a local businessman and town councillor). The village grew rapidly and by 1911 it had a population of over 500 people and was declared a town.  The town continued to expand and by 1913 its assessment totalled C$1.2 million.  In the summer of 1914 construction was started on the waterworks, sewage system and electric light plant. By 1921 the population was in excess of 2,000 people and the expansion of services continued to take place.

During the depression years Kamsack suffered, as did all communities during the period, and as a result the town's population dropped to 1,800 people.  This exodus of people was small compared to many other communities and Kamsack survived. During the summer of 1944 Kamsack once again faced adversity when it was hit by a tornado that is now referred to as the "Kamsack Cyclone."  The devastation involved 400 homes and 100 businesses and caused over C$2 million damage. The rebuilding process began again with the help of the veterans returning from World War II. As it turned out, this period turned into the biggest building boom in the town's history.

This building period included business, public and residential sections of the town. Water and sewer systems were extended, streets were paved and cement sidewalks were built.  The building boom continued right up to 1961 when the census showed 2941 residents in the town. In the 1970s Kamsack saw its business district continue to grow with the arrival of the Royal Bank, the construction of the "Kamplex" (a dual purpose hockey and curling rink) and construction began on the new hospital.

Demographics 

Attractions
Kamsack Culture Days
Kamsack Powerhouse Museum
 Duck Mountain Provincial Park
 Shellmouth Reservoir
 Madge Lake

Education
The public schools in Kamsack are part of Good Spirit School Division. Victoria School offers Pre-Kindergarten to Grade 4 and Kamsack Comprehensive Institute offers grades 5 to 12.

Parkland Regional College offers post-secondary education, SIAST and general interest classes.

People
Notable residents of Kamsack have included writers Eleanor Coerr, Myrna Dey and John Newlove, jurist Wilbur Jackett and hockey players Jack Church, Darcy Hordichuk, Harold Phillipoff, and Tyler Wright.

See also
List of place names in Canada of Indigenous origin
Kamsack Airport

References

External links

Cote No. 271, Saskatchewan
Towns in Saskatchewan
Division No. 9, Saskatchewan